The  Philadelphia Eagles season was the franchise's 56th season in the National Football League (NFL).

This season resulted an appearance in the postseason for the first time since 1981. The Eagles won the NFC East for the first time since 1980, but lost to the Chicago Bears in the NFC Divisional round during the Fog Bowl.

In control of their own destiny for a playoff berth, but not the NFC East title on the final day of the regular season, Philadelphia dumped the Dallas Cowboys, 23–7, guaranteed a minimum of a wild card berth following a New Orleans Saints win, but had to wait for the end to the New York Jets-New York Giants game at Giants Stadium to learn if they had clinched the division or not to avoid the Wild Card round. The Jets won the game, 27–21, on a late touchdown strike from Ken O'Brien to Al Toon, giving the Eagles the NFC East crown on the tiebreaker of having beaten the Giants in both regular-season meetings.

Offseason

NFL draft

Personnel

Staff

Roster

Regular season

Schedule

Note: Intra-division opponents are in bold text.

Season summary

Week 1

    
    
    
    
    
    
    
    
    

The Eagles played the Tampa Bay Buccaneers at Tampa Stadium where temperatures reached 90-degrees. On the Eagles’ fourth play of the game, Bucs linebacker Kevin Murphy chased Cunningham out of the pocket, and he rolled to his left and floated a 37-yard TD to Mike Quick. The first quarter ended with the Eagles up 21 to 0 after Anthony Toney ran for a TD and Cunningham threw an 8-yard TD to Jackson. The Eagles even scored on a 38-yard TD run by safety Terry Hoage on the only carry of his 13-year career.

Week 2

Week 3

Week 4

Week 5

Week 6

Week 7

Week 8

Week 9

Week 10

Week 11

Week 12

Week 13

Week 14

Week 15

Week 16

Standings

Playoffs

Divisional

Known as The Fog Bowl in NFL lore, the Bears defeated the Eagles, 20–12, in a contest in which a heavy, dense fog rolled over Chicago's Soldier Field during the second quarter and cut visibility to about 15–20 yards for the rest of the game.

Awards and honors
 NFL All-Rookie: Eric Allen
 Bert Bell Award: Randall Cunningham
 Sporting News Rookie of the Year: Keith Jackson

References

External links
 1988 Philadelphia Eagles at Pro-Football-Reference.com

Philadelphia Eagles seasons
Philadelphia Eagles
NFC East championship seasons
Philadelphia Eagles